Comet IRAS–Araki–Alcock (formal designation C/1983 H1, formerly 1983 VII) is a long-period comet that, in 1983, made the closest known approach to Earth of any comet in 200 years, at a distance of about . The comet was named after its discoverers the Infrared Astronomical Satellite and two amateur astronomers, George Alcock of the United Kingdom and Genichi Araki of Japan. Both men were schoolteachers by profession, although Alcock was retired. Alcock had made his discovery simply by observing through the window of his home, using binoculars. During the closest approach, the comet appeared as a circular cloud about the size of the full moon, having no discernible tail, and shining at a naked eye magnitude of 3–4. It swept across the sky at an angular speed of about 30 degrees per day. On May 11th the comet was detected on radar by Arecibo Observatory and Goldstone Solar System Radar making it the first comet detected by two different radar systems. A second detection was made by Goldstone on 14 May.

It is a long-period comet, with an orbital period of about 970 years, and is the parent comet of the minor Eta Lyrid meteor shower. This shower's radiant lies between Vega and Cygnus and produces 1 or 2 meteors an hour in mid-May with a peak between 9 May and 11 May.

Flyby comparison 
It was the closest approach up to that time of any comet in 200 years; only Lexell's Comet, in 1770, and 55P/Tempel-Tuttle, in 1366, are thought to have come closer.

1983 Flyby

References 
 

Near-Earth comets
Non-periodic comets
Discoveries by IRAS
IRAS catalogue objects
Astronomical objects discovered in 1983